Borgward Group AG was a Chinese-German automobile brand established in 2010 with headquarters in Stuttgart, Germany. The company carried the name and logo of the former German brand Borgward. Design and engineering was located in Germany, but the cars were  produced in China by Foton Motor.

Borgward started its business with a fleet of conventional SUVs with sales reaching approx. 75,000 units by January 2018 and has branches in China, Russia, India, Brazil and Mexico. However, the company aspires to become one of the leading electric vehicle manufacturers in the next decade. Full electric models, BXi7 and GT SUV BX6 were officially launched on May 9, 2018, in Beijing, China, and at the Frankfurt Motor Show 2017 presented the Isabella concept, its vision of a full-electric 4-door coupé.

History
Christian Borgward revived the Borgward trademark, with the help of the Chinese truck manufacturer Foton, who sold a stake in the company to the Chinese car rental group Ucar in 2019. Borgward Group AG is responsible for the development, production, sales and marketing of Borgward cars.

Genesis
In April 2005, Christian Borgward (grandson of Carl F. W. Borgward) as president and Karlheinz L. Knöss as CEO and vice president of the supervisory board started the revival of Borgward. They started the development of the new Borgward automobiles with car designers Roland Sternmann and Benjamin Nawka, set up the organisation and engineer team and developed several car concepts. On May 21, 2008, Borgward and Knöss founded Borgward Group AG in Lucerne, Switzerland, later relocating to Stuttgart, Germany.

Foton earned the rights to maintain the Borgward name in 2014.

Troubles
In 2018, Foton Motors announced plans to sell their stake at Borgward at 67%.

According to the German newspaper Automobilwoche, the company struggled to earn better sales after Foton sold its 67% stake to UCar in 2019 for $614 million. The newspaper said that Borgward sold around 5,000 vehicles in the first half of 2020. According to André Lacerda, a Borgward salesman in Luxembourg, the company does not have plans to halt reintroduction of Borgward vehicles throughout Europe.

Charles Zhengyao Lu, chairman of Luckin Coffee, was also involved in an accounting scandal, which played a role in the sudden sales decline.

Borgward has reportedly vacated its headquarters in Stuttgart as of 2020 with calls to the office going unanswered. By 2021, most vehicle productions have been ceased. Borgward's Malaysian operations have been discontinued due to lack of shipment of vehicle models from China and mediocre sales. Ucar denied news that the company is went bankrupt, but acknowledged difficulties in finding investors while it entered administration in June 2021. However, a Beijing court ordered its assets seized for failing to pay debt in December 2021.

Borgward filed for bankruptcy in Beijing on April 8, 2022. On December 5, 2022, the First Intermediate People’s Court of Beijing approved the company's bankruptcy declaration. 

Jochen Sibert from JSC Automotive, criticized the company's plan to use small stores instead of large dealerships to market the vehicles in 2020.

Overseas presence
At the 14th International Motor Show in Dubai on November 14, 2017, the Borgward BX5 and 7 are being marketed to GCC countries.

The brand is distributed in Malaysia by Go Bremen Motors, which was announced on May 2, 2018. An agreement signed between GBM and Borgward will also see manufacturing of vehicles and exports to some parts of ASEAN. However, plans to launch the brand in Malaysia in 2019 were stalled and suggestions were made that it would be launched by first quarter 2020. On July 7, 2018, the Luxembourgish company AUTODIS ESCH/MERSCH was appointed as the first European retailer/distributor for Borgward.

In April 2020, it was announced that DSM Global Company is in partnership with GBM to handle car exports to Nepal with the former handling Nepali operations.

Borgward announced that the company will retail its vehicles to Britain and Ireland in 2019 with models distributed by International Motors.

Production
Foton is currently Borgward's sole investor, but both companies have repeatedly announced that the ownership structure may change over time.

Borgward announced plans for a new car at the 2015 Geneva Motor Show after a 54-year hiatus. The new company is backed up financially by Chinese truck manufacturer Foton.

The Borgward BX7 SUV was introduced at the IAA, Frankfurt in September 2015. and sales in China started in July 2016.

Models

SUVs
 Borgward BX3
 Borgward BX5 
 Borgward BX6
 Borgward BX7

Concept cars
 Borgward Isabella Concept (2017)
 Borgward BXi7 (Electric Vehicle, SUV)

Sales
According to the China Association of Automobile Manufacturers (CAAMP), BG has reportedly sold around 30,000 BX7s in 2017.
Borgward sales in China in 2019 reached a record 45,321 units for the brand. (data from the CarSalesBase resource), but this is explained by the fact that UCAR Group purchased Borgvards to upgrade its own parks. In 2020, at the height of the COVID-19 pandemic, the demand for Borgguards in China fell to 8703 units, in 2021 to 3530 units.

References

External links
 
  
Borgward Group

Car brands
Borgward
Manufacturing companies based in Stuttgart
Luxury motor vehicle manufacturers
BAIC Group brands
Defunct motor vehicle manufacturers of China	
Defunct motor vehicle manufacturers of Germany